Bethany Baptist Church is a historic church at 117 W. Market Street in Newark, Essex County, New Jersey, United States.

The church traces its origins to 1870, when a group of African Americans established the church on Broad Street in Newark, in the building of the Peddie Memorial Baptist Church. Under the leadership of the Reverend Ebenezer Bird, who had come from Virginia to lead the congregation of about 26 members, the group was officially sanctioned as a church by the Council of Baptist Churches in June 1871. Thus, the church prides itself as being the "first Baptist congregation founded by people of African descent."

The Romanesque style church building was constructed in 1866. It was added to the National Register of Historic Places in 1989.

The church was under the stewardship of M. William Howard, Jr. from 2000 to 2015.

The old building appears to have been replaced by a housing complex, and has been replaced by a new building at 275 W. Market Street. The new building was dedicated on May 2, 1976.

See also 
 National Register of Historic Places listings in Essex County, New Jersey

References

African-American history in Newark, New Jersey
Baptist churches in New Jersey
Churches on the National Register of Historic Places in New Jersey
Churches completed in 1866
19th-century Baptist churches in the United States
Churches in Newark, New Jersey
National Register of Historic Places in Newark, New Jersey
1870 establishments in New Jersey
New Jersey Register of Historic Places